The AK-8 is a single-seat FAI-Standard Class sailplane, designed and built in Germany by members of Akaflieg Karlsruhe which can be distinguished by its elliptical leading edge.

Design and development

Made of synthetic materials, such as aramid fibre, carbon fibre and glass-fibre with cast aluminium alloy ribs, the AK-8 wing features an elliptical leading edge. The fuselage is derived from that of the DG-600M. 

The first flight of the AK-8 took place in 2003, but a field landing accident caused severe damage to the left wing. After the left wing was rebuilt, the AK-8 flew again in 2009. In 2014 new outer wings with winglets were built to improve the flying characteristic.

Specifications

See also
List of gliders

References

Bibliography

External links

Akaflieg Karlsruhe 

2000s German sailplanes
Akaflieg Karlsruhe aircraft
T-tail aircraft
Aircraft first flown in 2003